William B. Webber (October 31, 1836 – September 8, 1916) was an American lawyer and politician.

Webber was born in Urbana, Illinois and went to the public schools. He studied law and was admitted to the Illinois bar in 1863. Webber practiced law in Urbana, Illinois. He served in the Illinois House of Representatives in 1885 and 1886 and was a Democrat. In 18, he served as mayor of Urbana, Illinois. Webber died at his home in Urbana, Illinois, from heart problems.

Notes

1836 births
1916 deaths
People from Urbana, Illinois
Illinois lawyers
Mayors of places in Illinois
Democratic Party members of the Illinois House of Representatives
19th-century American lawyers